Gniewoszów may refer to the following places in Poland:
Gniewoszów, Lower Silesian Voivodeship (south-west Poland)
Gniewoszów, Masovian Voivodeship (east-central Poland)